v.Spy v.Spy, also known as Spy vs Spy, were an Australian pub rock band from Sydney formed in 1981. They became known for tackling political issues through their music, including racism, homelessness and contemporary drug culture. They were named after a comic strip, "Spy vs. Spy" in the US Mad magazine.

The band's initial line-up was the trio of Craig Bloxom on bass guitar/lead vocals, Cliff Grigg on drums/percussion and Michael Weiley on lead guitar/vocals. v.Spy v.Spy's early music was ska-influenced indie rock, exemplified by their debut single "Do What You Say" on the independent Green label in April 1982. They released an EP Four Fresh Lemons in August. Their music became more straightforward hard rock for their pub audiences. The band broke up in early 1983 only to reform mid-year, by which time they were using the name v.Spy v.Spy to avoid legal problems with Mad magazine. They were eventually signed to Midnight Oil's label Powderworks and managed by legendary Oils manager, Gary Morris. Their first full-length album Harry's Reasons was released in March 1986 and produced by Leszek Karski. They switched labels to WEA and had their highest charting success in February 1987 with their single "Don't Tear It Down" on the Australian singles chart and the associated album A.O. Mod. TV. Vers. peaked at No. 12 on the Australian albums chart.

v.Spy v.Spy's follow-up album, Xenophobia (Why?) was released in March 1988 and peaked at No. 15 in Australia. It was produced by Karski and Guy Gray and released by WEA in 14 countries. Their 1989 album Trash the Planet peaked at No. 22 on the ARIA Charts.

History

1981–1983: Formation
Craig Bloxom lead vocalist/bassist was born in Los Angeles and moved to Australia in 1965, he met guitarist/vocalist Michael Weiley at Nelson Bay High School in 1976. Weiley, having just moved from England to Australia, was paired with Bloxom by the principal based on their common musical interests and plans on making a career in music. After high school, Bloxom and Weiley moved to Cammeray in Sydney's north shore, playing in various Sydney bands. Looking for a drummer, one of Bloxom's ex-bandmates introduced them to Cliff Grigg, who happened to live in a squat in the inner Sydney suburb of Glebe. They named their band for a comic strip, "Spy vs. Spy" in the US Mad magazine. As a rent saving device Bloxom and Weiley also moved into Grigg's squat, which initially had no roof: it also became their rehearsal space.

v.Spy v.Spy had their first performance at Sydney's Sussex Hotel, filling in for The Fast Cars, whose singer had unexpectedly taken ill. From there the band developed an enthusiastic following for their distinctive brand of heavy rock. Dirty Pool management picked them up and they performed at many Sydney venues, particularly at the Sydney Trade Union Club, quite often supporting INXS. They also supported The Clash at the Capitol Theatre and U2 at the Sydney Entertainment Centre among others.

In February 1982 the band recorded "Do What You Say" at T.R.M. in Surry Hills, releasing it as their first single in April 1982 on Roger Greirson's independent Green label. This was followed by their first EP, Four Fresh Lemons in August 1982, the 1,000 pressings selling out in just five days. The New Zealand release of Six Fresh Lemons, combined Four Fresh Lemons with the A & B sides of their first single. These recordings were released under the name Spy vs Spy, but the band was forced to change its name to v.Spy v.Spy to avoid legal action from the publishers of MAD magazine, which included the comic strip "Spy vs. Spy". Their music became more straight forward hard rock for their Australian pub audiences who thrived on a diet of AC/DC, The Angels, Rose Tattoo and Radio Birdman.

The band became prominent on the Sydney pub rock scene, performing high energy politically charged songs dealing with issues such as racism of any kind (particularly that against Indigenous Australians - a scourge of society that exists to this day), drug addiction, homelessness, homophobia, sexual assault, child abuse and domestic violence. Shortly after the release of their debut EP, in early 1983, the band broke up. Bloxom briefly joined The Numbers in March 1983 but re-formed v.Spy v.Spy in July 1983, with Marcus Phelan (ex-The Numbers) joining as a second guitarist. Weiley became sick with hepatitis, confined to a hospital bed for months his illness plagued him until his untimely death but he never complained - he fought and played to the very end. Second guitarist Mark Phelan left after the band's equipment was stolen while the band was at a social security meeting.

1984–1988: Peak years
Fortunes improved when Gary Morris, manager for Midnight Oil, also became the manager of v.Spy v.Spy. Midnight Oil's label, Powderworks, released the EP Meet Us Inside in October 1984, which was followed by the single "One of a Kind" in November 1984. 

The music video for "One of a Kind" was filmed outside the famous Sygna shipwreck near Stockton, NSW. 

The band's first full-length album, Harry's Reasons, was released in March 1986 on the Powderworks label and was produced by Leszek Karski. Singles included "Injustice", about the plight of Australia's aboriginal communities (dedicated to the Aboriginal Arts Council) released in August 1985, "Give Us Something" dealing with the media, was released in February 1986 and "Harry's Reasons", about a friend's heroin addiction ('Harry' is a euphemism for heroin), which was released in May 1986. Neither album nor singles had any major chart success.

They switched labels signing with WEA and released a follow-up album A.O. Mod. TV. Vers. in November 1986. The name is an abbreviation meaning "Adults Only Modified Television Version", a very common censorship notation appearing along the bottom of Australian television screens at the time. It provided three singles – "Don't Tear It Down" inspired by the Department of Main Roads seeking to demolish the band's Darling Street squat, "Sallie-Anne'" about murdered prostitute/whistleblower Sallie-Anne Huckstepp and "Credit Cards" a commentary on spiralling debt and consumerism. "Credit Cards" was particularly pertinent as Australia was in the middle of a national debate about introducing a national identification card called the "Australia Card". "Don't Tear It Down" was the band's most successful single, peaking at No. 31 on the Kent Music Report of the Australian singles charts in February 1987, it stayed in the charts for 20 weeks attaining platinum certification.

After having toured the A.O. Mod. TV. Vers. album, WEA demanded another album. The third album, Xenophobia, was written and recorded in just six weeks, the title inspired by disgusting racism surfacing in the lead-up to Australia's upcoming Bicentennial year. The album released in March 1988 peaked at No. 15 in Australia, it was produced by Karski and Guy Gray and released by WEA in 14 countries. The album provided three singles, "Forget about the Working Week", "Clarity of Mind" and "Waiting". During this time the band played smaller shows to dedicated fans in Sydney under the pseudonym The Drug Grannies.

1989–1993: Continued success
In 1989 the band received a large advance from their record label and travelled to the United Kingdom to record the album Trash the Planet, at Richard Branson's Manor House studios, produced by Craig Leon. The album was released in November 1989 and peaked at No. 22 on the ARIA Charts. Four singles were issued – "Hardtimes", "Clear Skies" in February 1990, "Our House" in May and "Oceania" in October but none peaked into the Top 40.

Grigg quit the band in late 1991, joining Mixed Relations as guest percussionist, whilst Bloxom and Weiley took a year off, moving to Queensland and going through a period of auditioning new drummers.

Rejuvenated by a new lineup featuring new drummer Mark Cuffe, the band signed a lucrative deal with Sony Music Australia. In May 1993 they released their fifth album, Fossil, produced by Karski and Peter Cobbin, provided the singles "Comes a Time" in March 1993 and "One Way Street" in June 1993 to moderate success and critical acclaim. During this time, due to the influence of Australian surfers in Brazil, the band had built up a considerable Brazilian following, resulting in numerous Brazilian tours playing to the biggest audiences of the bands career. To this day, Brazil remains the band's strongest market.

In 1993 the band was featured in two episodes of The Big Backyard, a weekly radio program promoting Australian music, sponsored by the Department of Foreign Affairs and Trade for broadcast on college radio stations in the USA and Canada - this gave the band a spike in interest across the United States.

1994–2003: Regrouping and split
By 1994 v.Spy v.Spy had split up again with members pursuing different projects. Bloxom and Cuffe formed the band Shock Poets, meanwhile Weiley worked on his side-project The Honey Island Project with producer Danny Bryan. v.Spy v.Spy reformed in 1996. Cuffe left to concentrate full-time on Shock Poets, replaced by drummer Paul Wheeler of Icehouse,

In November 1999, Festival Records issued a compilation album, Mugshot: The Best of... which included several classic tracks and five previously unreleased songs.

Touring constantly for fans in Australia and Brazil, Bloxom eventually played his final gig in Sydney in 2003 leaving Australia for the USA, settling in Mexico finding a new career path as a successfully renowned chef. Bloxom now lives in Newcastle, New South Wales. Weiley and Cuffe re-formed in August 2006 to tour as a new entity with Cuffe on vocals, Neil Beaver on bass and Mick Laws on drums. 

Whilst v.Spy v.Spy broke up in 2003, the legacy of the band continues with a tribute band featuring Cliff Grigg on drums continuing to perform from time to time under the name Spy v Spy. This tribute band released an album titled "New Reasons" available through their website spyvspy.com.au

The band's catalogue was made officially available for download on Spotify, iTunes and other digital platforms in 2016.

Michael Weiley tragically died after a cancer battle on 29 September 2018.

Discography

Studio albums

Live albums

Compilation albums

Extended play

Singles

References

Musical groups established in 1981
Australian rock music groups
New South Wales musical groups
Pub rock musical groups